Rakaia was a New Zealand parliamentary electorate in the Canterbury region from 1972 to 1978 and 1993 to 2008.

The seat was held by former Prime Minister Jenny Shipley from 1993 to 2002, and by Brian Connell from 2002 to 2008.

Population centres
There were 84 electorates for the 1969 election, and the 1972 electoral redistribution saw three additional general seats created for the North Island, bringing the total number of electorates to 87. Together with increased urbanisation in Christchurch and Nelson, the changes proved very disruptive to existing electorates. In the South Island, three electorates were abolished, and three electorates were newly created (including Rakaia). In the North Island, five electorates were abolished, two electorates were recreated, and six electorates were newly created.

The electorate included the following population centres:
 Ashburton
 Darfield
 Leeston
 Lincoln
 Methven
 Rakaia
 Rolleston
 Southbridge
 West Melton

History
The Rakaia seat previously existed from 1972 to 1978, when it was held by Colin McLachlan of the National Party, who previously and subsequently held the Selwyn seat.  It was recreated in 1993 as a replacement for Ashburton.

Due to boundary changes for the 2008 general election, the Rakaia seat ceased to exist. Its population centres were redistributed among the new seats of Rangitata and Selwyn.

In the 2008 election, Selwyn was expected to be a safe National seat while  was considered vulnerable to capture by Labour due to the presence of the city of Timaru. While Amy Adams won Selwyn for National as expected, Rangitata was taken by National's Jo Goodhew.

Members of Parliament
Key

Election results

1999 election
Refer to Candidates in the New Zealand general election 1999 by electorate#Rakaia for a list of candidates.

1975 election

1972 election

Notes

References

External links
Electorate Profile  Parliamentary Library

Historical electorates of New Zealand
1972 establishments in New Zealand
1978 disestablishments in New Zealand
1993 establishments in New Zealand
2008 disestablishments in New Zealand